Kaio Felipe Gonçalves or simply Kaio (born July 6, 1987 in Curitiba), is a Brazilian professional footballer who plays as a striker. He is currently a free agent.

Career
Made professional debut in 2-1 victory over Iraty in the Campeonato Paranaense on January 21, 2007.

On 4 June 2013, Kaio joined UAE Pro-League side Al Wasl FC, ending a 3-year stint at Yokohama FC in Japan.

In 2015, Kaio joined K League Classic in Korea side Suwon Samsung Bluewings

In January 2016 Kaio signed for Buriram United in the Thai League T1.

Club statistics

References

External links
 

  rubronegro.net
  CBF
  sambafoot.com
  furacao.com
  

1987 births
Living people
Brazilian footballers
Brazilian expatriate footballers
J. Malucelli Futebol players
Paraná Clube players
Club Athletico Paranaense players
Cerezo Osaka players
Yokohama FC players
Al-Wasl F.C. players
Jeonbuk Hyundai Motors players
Suwon Samsung Bluewings players
Kaio Felipe Goncalves
Yunnan Flying Tigers F.C. players
Kyoto Sanga FC players
J2 League players
K League 1 players
Kaio Felipe Goncalves
China League One players
Brazilian people of Japanese descent
Expatriate footballers in Japan
Expatriate footballers in South Korea
Expatriate footballers in Thailand
Expatriate footballers in the United Arab Emirates
Expatriate footballers in China
Brazilian expatriate sportspeople in the United Arab Emirates
Brazilian expatriate sportspeople in Japan
Brazilian expatriate sportspeople in South Korea
Brazilian expatriate sportspeople in Thailand
Brazilian expatriate sportspeople in China
Association football midfielders
UAE Pro League players
Emirates Club players
Footballers from Curitiba